Avery is an English surname that arrived in England after the Norman Conquest, derived from the French surname Evreux from the county Evreux in Normandy. The name came from the Galician-Portuguese name Abreu. It can also be found in the northern Spanish region of Navarra, where the House of Évreux was a ruling royal house from 1328 to 1441. At the time, the name's frequency was highest in Devon (5.9 times the British average), followed by Sussex, Buckinghamshire, Rutland, Worcestershire, Oxfordshire, Kent, Warwickshire, Cornwall and Somerset.


Notable people with the surname include:

Activism 
 Byllye Avery, American health care activist
 Greg Avery, British animal rights activist
 Rachel Foster Avery, 19th century American suffragist
 Rosa Miller Avery (1830–1894), American abolitionist, political reformer, suffragist, writer; mother-in-law of Rachel Foster Avery

Law and politics 
 Bill Avery (born 1940), Nebraska politician and professor
 Brian Avery (activist), former volunteer for the International Solidarity Movement
 Carlos Avery (1868–1930), Minnesota newspaper publisher and politician
 Ephraim Kingsbury Avery, Methodist minister accused of an 1832 murder
 Isaac E. Avery, Colonel in the Confederate Army during the American Civil War
 James Avery (American colonist) (1620–1700), Connecticut colonist, legislator, and military commander
 John Avery (politician), physician and politician from Michigan
 John Keith Avery, former commissioner of the New South Wales police
 Oscar F. Avery (1841–1924), Illinois state senator and lawyer
 Steven Avery, American exonerated by DNA evidence for a crime
 Waightstill Avery, North Carolina's first attorney general and a colonel during the American Revolutionary War
 William H. Avery (politician) (1911–2009), former governor of Kansas
 William Tecumsah Avery (1819–1880), former member of the United States House of Representatives

Literature 
 Catharine Hitchcock Tilden Avery (1844–1911), American author, editor, educator
 Fiona Avery, comic book and television writer
 George Avery, American professor of German Studies
 Gillian Avery, British children's writer and scholar
 Harold Avery, British author of children's literature
 Tom Avery, explorer, mountaineer, author, and motivational speaker
 Valeen Tippetts Avery, American biographer and historian

Performance and music 
 Brad Avery, guitarist for the rock band Third Day
 Charles Avery, American blues and boogie-woogie pianist
 Dylan Avery, American filmmaker 
 Eric Avery, original bass player for Jane's Addiction
 Jack Avery, member of the American pop band Why Don't We
 James Avery (actor) (1945–2013), American actor known for playing "Uncle Phil" on The Fresh Prince of Bel-Air
 James Avery (musician) (1937–2009), American and German pianist and conductor
 Margaret Avery, American singer and actress
 Patricia Avery (1902–1973), American silent film actress
 Phyllis Avery, American actress
 Shondrella Avery, American actress
 Val Avery (1924–2009), American actor

Science and engineering 
 Clarence W. Avery, engineer at Ford Motor Company
 John Scales Avery, theoretical chemist and peace activist
 Oswald Avery, physician and scientist
 R. Stanton Avery, (1907–1997), American inventor, created self-adhesive labels, founded Avery Dennison Corporation.
 Robert Hanneman Avery, founded the Avery Company, an American farm tractor, truck and automobile manufacturer.
 William H. Avery (engineer), aeronautics engineer

Sports 
 Albert Avery, English rugby league footballer
 Donnie Avery (born 1984), American football player
 Genard Avery (born 1995), American football player
 George Avery Young (1866–1900), English sportsman who played rugby and cricket
 Gordon George Avery (1925–2006), Australian track and field athlete
 James Avery (baseball) (born 1984) Canadian baseball player
 Jim Avery (born 1944), American football player
 John Avery (Canadian football), Canadian football player
 Ryan Avery (lacrosse), former lacrosse player
 Sean Avery (born April 10, 1980), Canadian professional hockey player
 Steve Avery, former Major League Baseball pitcher
 Tre Avery (born 1997), American football player
 William Avery (basketball), professional basketball player
 Xavier Avery (born 1990), American baseball player

Visual arts 
 Milton Avery, American Modernist painter
 Tex Avery, animator and director; creator of Bugs Bunny and Daffy Duck
 Susanna Avery-Quash (born 1970), an English art historian,  Avery

Other 
 Bryan Avery, British architect
 Cyrus Avery, American highway commissioner
 Henry Every (or Avery), 17th-century pirate
 James Avery (Medal of Honor), (1825–1898) Union Navy seaman and recipient of the Medal of Honor during the American Civil War
 Peter Avery, Fellow of King's College, Cambridge
 R. Stanton Avery, founder of Avery Dennison Corporation and namesake of Caltech's Avery House
 Sewell Avery, U.S. businessman
 William Beilby Avery (1854–1908), philatelist

Fictional characters 
 Jackson Avery, in the TV series Grey's Anatomy, or his grandfather, Harper Avery
 Avery, a minor Death Eater in the Harry Potter series
 Bree Avery, protagonist of the lonelygirl15 Internet video series
 Rupert Avery, a main character in The Serpentwar Saga
 Shug Avery, one of the main characters in the 1983 novel The Color Purple

See also 
 Justice Avery (disambiguation)
 Averin (surname), a Russian surname
 Every (surname)

References 

sv:Dödsätare#Avery